A commercium is a traditional academic feast known at universities in most Central and Northern European countries. Today it is still organised by student fraternities in Germanic and Baltic countries, as well as Poland.

At a commercium, tables are often placed in the form of a U or a W, and the participants drink beer and sing commercium songs. There are strict and traditional rules that govern this occasion but it may also integrate theatrical and musical aspects. A commercium is the more formal form of the tableround, called  in German.

The term is derived from the French  and had been used for any sort of noisy event. A Commers gathering consists of speeches, toasts and songs, sometimes arranged pranks as well. The drink of preference is beer. The sort of event started to be more formalized after 1871. German associations like firefighters or Schützenvereine started to arrange commerciums in the 19th century and still do on special occasions.

The guests rise and having emptied their glasses hammer three times on the table with them. The operetta The Student Prince made German students' drinking habits famous during the prohibition, and the rousing chorus of "Drink! Drink! Drink!" was especially popular with US theatergoers in 1924. In the last years of communist Eastern Germany, some students managed to arrange for new founded fraternities, e.g. Salana Jenensis in Jena and organized commerciums on the Rudelsburg.

See also
Cantus
Sitsit
Studniówka
Studentenverbindung

References

Academic meals
Eating parties
Student societies in Germany